Ma Yexin is a Chinese tennis player.

Ma has a career-high WTA singles ranking of 426, achieved on 07 November 2022, and a career-high WTA doubles ranking of 210, achieved on 16 January 2023.

In 2020, Ma they won the tournament in Antalya, Turkey, with Kazakh Partner Zhibek Kulambayeva in doubles.

Ma won her first major ITF title at the Nonthaburi, Thailand in the doubles draw partnering Liang En-shuo. The following week, they won the ITF40 Nonthaburi title, beating Taiwan's Lee Pei-chi and Indonesian Jessy Rompies in the final.

Early life
Ma Yexin was born on 10 June 1999. From the age of 4 to 12 years old, she was coached by her father, Ma Dean. When Ma Yexin graduated from elementary school in 2011, Ma Dean went with her to Beijing in order to learn from Carlos Rodríguez. After a year and a half, Ma Yexin switched to Peng Shuai's former coach Ma Wei, while training in the Xinghewan Professional Tennis Club at the same time.

ITF finals

Doubles (9 titles, 2 runner-ups)

References

External links
 
 

1999 births
Living people
Chinese female tennis players
21st-century Chinese women